Children's Castle (Lastenlinna) is a children's hospital in Helsinki, Finland. It is part of Helsinki University Central Hospital.

The hospital was established in 1917 in the Kallio district of Helsinki. The building was designed by the Finnish architect Elsi Borg. Its current building in Taka-Töölö was completed in 1948.

Pediatrician Arvo Ylppö was the hospital chief of Children's Castle from 1920 to 1963.

See also
 Mannerheim League for Child Welfare

Children's hospitals
Hospitals in Helsinki
Hospital buildings completed in 1948
Hospitals established in 1917
Child-related organisations in Finland